Njeri Njiiri Karago (born 1960) is a Kenyan  film producer and current Kenyan Consul-General for the consulate in Los Angeles. She attended UCLA, and after a career in the film industry, took over as consul-general 1 July 2019.

Filmography
 The Ascent, (1994)
 The Great Elephant Escape, (1995)
 Bridge of Time, (1997)
 Robinson Crusoe, (1997)
 Clover, (1997)
 Hidden Blessings, (2000, executive)
 Dangerous Affair, (2002, executive)
 Money and the Cross, (2006)
 Disconnect, (2018)

References

Kenyan film producers
Kenyan diplomats
1960 births
Living people